Miria Contreras (April 28, 1927 – November 22, 2002) was Salvador Allende's mistress and secretary. She was born in Taltal, Chile. After the coup that ousted Allende as president of Cuba she received political asylum in Cuba. She and Beatriz Allende, the president's daughter, were close confidantes of Allende. Her son was detained and killed.

References

Salvador Allende
Living people
1927 births